Jörn Wemmer (born 13 May 1984) is a German former professional footballer who played as a midfielder. Wemmer played most of his career with a mix of professional and amateur teams from levels 4 through 6, but he did sign with professional Erzgebirge Aue as a backup player for two seasons, appearing in seven matches with them in level 3. Liga, then five matches in level 2. Bundesliga during his second season with the team.

Personal life
Wemmer is the older brother of footballer Jens Wemmer.

He joined lower-league side in TSG Einheit Bernau in 2016.

References

External links

1984 births
Living people
German footballers
Footballers from Berlin
Association football midfielders
3. Liga players
SpVg Aurich players
SV Meppen players
VfL Wolfsburg II players
FC Oberneuland players
FC Erzgebirge Aue players
Berliner AK 07 players
Berliner FC Dynamo players